The 2023 Nigeria Invitational Women's T20I Tournament is a women's T20I cricket (WT20I) tournament that is scheduled to take place in Nigeria from 27 March to 2 April 2023. The venue for all of the matches will be the Tafawa Balewa Square Cricket Oval in Lagos. This will be the second edition of the tournament, with Rwanda returning to defend the title. In the 2022 tournament, Rwanda defeated the hosts Nigeria in the final.

In addition to the 2022 finalists, Ghana and Sierra Leone also return this year, while Cameroon will make their debut in the tournament. Gambia, who competed in 2022, withdrew for personal reasons.

Round-robin

Points table

Fixtures

Third-place play-off

Final

References

2023 in women's cricket
Associate international cricket competitions in 2022–23
Nigeria Invitational Women's T20I Tournament
Nigeria Invitational Women's T20I Tournament